The Black Sox Scandal was a Major League Baseball game-fixing scandal in which eight members of the Chicago White Sox were accused of throwing the 1919 World Series against the Cincinnati Reds in exchange for money from a gambling syndicate led by Arnold Rothstein. As a response, the National Baseball Commission was dissolved and Judge Kenesaw Mountain Landis was appointed to be the first Commissioner of Baseball, and given absolute control over the sport to restore its integrity.

Despite acquittals in a public trial in 1921, Judge Landis permanently banned all eight men from professional baseball. The punishment was eventually defined by the Baseball Hall of Fame to include banishment from consideration for the Hall. Despite requests for reinstatement in the decades that followed (particularly in the case of Shoeless Joe Jackson), the ban remained.

Background

Tension in the clubhouse and Charles Comiskey

White Sox club owner Charles Comiskey, himself a prominent MLB player from 1882 to 1894, was widely disliked by the players and was resented for his miserliness. Comiskey, who as a player had taken part in the Players' League labor rebellion in 1890, long had a reputation for underpaying his players, even though they were one of the top teams in the league and had already won the 1917 World Series.

Because of baseball's reserve clause, any player who refused to accept a contract was prohibited from playing baseball on any other professional team under the auspices of "Organized Baseball." Players could not change teams without permission from their current team, and without a union the players had no bargaining power. Comiskey was probably no worse than most owners. In fact, Chicago had the largest team payroll in 1919. In the era of the reserve clause, gamblers could find players on many teams looking for extra cash—and they did.

The White Sox clubhouse was divided into two factions. One group resented the more straitlaced players (later called the "Clean Sox"), a group that included players like second baseman Eddie Collins, a graduate of Columbia College of Columbia University; catcher Ray Schalk, and pitchers Red Faber and Dickey Kerr. By contemporary accounts, the two factions rarely spoke to each other on or off the field, and the only thing they had in common was a resentment of Comiskey.

The conspiracy

A meeting of White Sox players—including those committed to going ahead and those just ready to listen—took place on September 21, in Chick Gandil's room at the Ansonia Hotel in New York City. Buck Weaver was the only player to attend the meetings who did not receive money. Nevertheless, he was later banned along with the others for knowing about the fix but not reporting it.

Although he hardly played in the series, utility infielder Fred McMullin got word of the fix and threatened to report the others unless he was in on the payoff. As a small coincidence, McMullin was a former teammate of the retired player William "Sleepy Bill" Burns, who had a minor role in the fix. Both had played for the Los Angeles Angels of the Pacific Coast League, and Burns had previously pitched for the White Sox in 1909 and 1910. Star outfielder Shoeless Joe Jackson was mentioned as a participant but did not attend the meetings, and his involvement is disputed.

The scheme got an unexpected boost when the straitlaced Faber could not pitch due to a bout with the flu. Years later, Schalk said that if Faber had been available, the fix would have likely never happened, since Faber would have almost certainly started games that went instead to two of the alleged conspirators, pitchers Eddie Cicotte and Lefty Williams.

Conduct of the World Series

On October 1, the day of Game One, there were rumors amongst gamblers that the series was fixed, and a sudden influx of money being bet on Cincinnati caused the odds against them to fall rapidly. These rumors also reached the press box where a number of correspondents, including Hugh Fullerton of the Chicago Herald and Examiner and ex-player and manager Christy Mathewson, resolved to compare notes on any plays and players that they felt were questionable. However, most fans and observers were taking the series at face value. On October 2, the Philadelphia Bulletin published a poem which would quickly prove to be ironic:

Still, it really doesn't matter,
After all, who wins the flag.
Good clean sport is what we're after,
And we aim to make our brag
To each near or distant nation
Whereon shines the sporting sun
That of all our games gymnastic
Base ball is the cleanest one!

After throwing a strike with his first pitch of the Series, Cicotte's second pitch struck Cincinnati leadoff hitter Morrie Rath in the back, delivering a pre-arranged signal confirming the players' willingness to go through with the fix. In the fourth inning, Cicotte made a bad throw to Swede Risberg at second base. Sportswriters found the unsuccessful double play to be suspicious.

Williams, one of the "Eight Men Out", lost three games, a Series record. Rookie Dickie Kerr, who was not part of the fix, won both of his starts. But the gamblers were now reneging on their promised progress payments (to be paid after each game lost), claiming that all the money was let out on bets and was in the hands of the bookmakers. After Game 5, angry about the non-payment of promised money, the players involved in the fix attempted to doublecross the gamblers and won Games 6 and 7 of the best-of-nine Series.
Before Game 8, threats of violence were made on the gamblers' behalf against players and family members. Williams started Game 8, but gave up four straight one-out hits for three runs before manager Kid Gleason relieved him. The White Sox lost Game 8 (and the series) on October 9, 1919. Besides Weaver, the players involved in the scandal received $5,000 each or more, with Gandil taking $35,000.

Fallout

Grand jury (1920)
Rumors of the fix dogged the White Sox throughout the 1920 season as they battled the Cleveland Indians for the American League pennant, and stories of corruption touched players on other clubs as well. At last, in September 1920, a grand jury was convened to investigate; Cicotte confessed to his participation in the scheme to the grand jury on September 28.

On the eve of their final season series, the White Sox were in a virtual tie for first place with the Indians. The Sox would need to win all three of their remaining games and then hope for Cleveland to stumble, as the Indians had more games left to play than the Sox. Despite the season being on the line, Comiskey suspended the seven White Sox still in the majors (Gandil had not returned to the team in 1920 and was playing semi-pro ball). He said that he had no choice but to suspend them, even though this action likely cost the Sox any chance of winning a second consecutive pennant. The Sox lost two of the three games in the final series against the St. Louis Browns and finished in second place, two games behind the Indians, who went on to win the World Series.

The grand jury issued its decision on October 22, 1920, and eight players and five gamblers were implicated. The indictments included nine counts of conspiracy to defraud. The ten players not implicated in the gambling scandal, as well as manager Kid Gleason, were each given bonus checks in the amount of $1,500 by Comiskey in the fall of 1920, the amount equaling the difference between the winners' and losers' share for participation in the 1919 World Series.

Trial (1921)

The trial began on June 27, 1921, in Chicago, but was delayed by Judge Hugo Friend because two defendants, Ben Franklin and Carl Zork, claimed to be ill. Right fielder Shano Collins was named as the wronged party in the indictments, accusing his corrupt teammates of having cost him $1,784 as a result of the scandal. Before the trial, key evidence went missing from the Cook County courthouse, including the signed confessions of Cicotte and Jackson, who subsequently recanted their confessions. Some years later, the missing confessions reappeared in the possession of Comiskey's lawyer.

On July 1, the prosecution announced that former White Sox player "Sleepy Bill" Burns, who was under indictment for his part in the scandal, had turned state's evidence and would testify. During jury selection on July 11, several members of the current White Sox team, including manager Kid Gleason, visited the courthouse, chatting and shaking hands with the indicted ex-players; at one point they even tickled Weaver, who was known to be quite ticklish. Jury selection took several days, but on July 15 twelve jurors were finally empaneled in the case.

Trial testimony began on July 18, 1921, when prosecutor Charles Gorman outlined the evidence he planned to present against the defendants:
The spectators added to the bleacher appearance of the courtroom, for most of them sweltered in shirtsleeves, and collars were few. Scores of small boys jammed their way into the seats and as Mr. Gorman told of the alleged sell-out, they repeatedly looked at each other in awe, remarking under their breaths: 'What do you think of that?' or 'Well, I'll be darned.'
White Sox President Charles Comiskey was then called to the stand, and became so agitated with questions being posed by the defense that he rose from the witness chair and shook his fist at the defendants' counsel, Ben Short.

The most explosive testimony began the following day, July 19, when Burns took the stand and admitted that members of the White Sox had intentionally fixed the 1919 World Series; Burns mentioned the involvement of Rothstein among others, and testified that Cicotte had threatened to throw the ball clear out of the park if needed to lose a game. After additional testimony and evidence, on July 28 the defense rested and the case went to the jury. The jury deliberated for less than three hours before returning verdicts of not guilty on all charges for all of the accused players.

Landis appointed Commissioner, bans all eight players (1921)

Long before the scandal broke, many of baseball's owners had nursed longstanding grievances with the way the game was then governed by the National Commission. The scandal and the damage it caused to the game's reputation gave owners the resolve to make major changes to the governance of the sport. The owners' original plan was to appoint the widely respected federal judge and noted baseball fan Kenesaw Mountain Landis to head a reformed three-member National Commission. However, Landis made it clear to the owners that he would only accept an appointment as the game's sole Commissioner, and even then only on the condition that he be granted essentially unchecked power over the sport. The owners, desperate to clean up the game's image, agreed to his terms, and vested him with virtually unlimited authority over every person in both the major and minor leagues. It was controversial at the time for the MLB to move toward a single commissioner with sole governance on behalf of the owners.

Upon taking office prior to the 1921 Major League Baseball season, one of Landis' first acts as Commissioner was to use his new powers to place the eight accused players on an "ineligible list", a decision that effectively left them suspended indefinitely from all of "organized" professional baseball (although not from semi-pro barnstorming teams).

Following the players' acquittals, Landis was quick to quash any prospect that he might reinstate the implicated players. On August 3, 1921, the day after the players were acquitted, Commissioner Landis issued his own verdict:

Making use of a precedent that had previously seen Babe Borton, Harl Maggert, Gene Dale, and Bill Rumler banned from the Pacific Coast League for fixing games, Landis made it clear that all eight accused players would remain on the "ineligible list", banning them from organized baseball. The Commissioner took the position that while the players had been acquitted in court, there was no dispute they had broken the rules of baseball, and none of them could ever be allowed back in the game if it were to regain the trust of the public. Comiskey supported Landis by giving the seven who remained under contract to the White Sox their unconditional release.

Following the Commissioner's statement, it was universally understood that all eight implicated White Sox players were to be banned from Major League Baseball for life. Two other players believed to be involved were also banned. One of them was Hal Chase, who had been effectively blackballed from the majors in 1919 for a long history of throwing games and had spent 1920 in the minors. He was rumored to have been a go-between for Gandil and the gamblers, though it has never been confirmed. Regardless of this, it was understood that Landis' announcement not only formalized his 1919 blacklisting from the majors but barred him from the minors as well.

Landis, relying upon his years of experience as a federal judge and attorney, used this decision (the "case") as the founding precedent (of the reorganized league) for the Commissioner of Baseball to be the highest and final authority over baseball as an organized professional sport in the United States. He established the precedent that the Commissioner was invested by the league with plenary power and the responsibility to determine the fitness or suitability of anyone, anything, or any circumstance, to be associated with professional baseball, past, present, and future.

Banned players

Eight members of the White Sox baseball team were banned by Landis for their involvement in the fix:
 Arnold "Chick" Gandil, first baseman. The leader of the players who were in on the fix. He did not play in the majors in 1920, playing semi-pro ball instead. In a 1956 Sports Illustrated article, he expressed remorse for the scheme but wrote that the players had actually abandoned it when it became apparent they were going to be watched closely. According to Gandil, the players' numerous errors were a result of fear that they were being watched.
 Eddie Cicotte, pitcher. Admitted involvement in the fix.
 Oscar "Happy" Felsch, center fielder.
 "Shoeless" Joe Jackson, the star outfielder and one of the best hitters in the game, confessed in sworn grand jury testimony to having accepted $5,000 cash from the gamblers. It was also Jackson's sworn testimony that he never met or spoke to any of the gamblers and was only told about the fix through conversations with other White Sox players. The other players who were in on the fix informed him that he would receive $20,000 cash divided up in equal payments after each loss. Jackson's testimony was that he played to win in the entire Series and did nothing on the field to throw any of the games in any way. His roommate, pitcher Lefty Williams, brought $5,000 in cash up to their hotel room after losing Game 4 in Chicago and threw it down as they were packing to travel back to Cincinnati. This was the only money that Jackson received at any time. He later recanted his confession and professed his innocence to no effect until his death in 1951. The extent of Jackson's collaboration with the scheme is hotly debated.
 Fred McMullin, utility infielder. McMullin would not have been included in the fix had he not overheard the other players' conversations. His role as team scout may have had more impact on the fix since he saw minimal playing time in the series.
 Charles "Swede" Risberg, shortstop. Risberg was Gandil's assistant and the "muscle" of the playing group. He went 2-for-25 at the plate and committed four errors in the series.
 George "Buck" Weaver, third baseman. Weaver attended the initial meetings, and while he did not go in on the fix, he knew about it. In an interview in 1956, Gandil said that it was Weaver's idea to get the money up front from the gamblers. Landis banished him on this basis, stating, "Men associating with crooks and gamblers could expect no leniency." On January 13, 1922, Weaver unsuccessfully applied for reinstatement. Like Jackson, Weaver continued to profess his innocence to successive baseball commissioners to no effect.
 Claude "Lefty" Williams, pitcher. Went 0–3 with a 6.63 ERA for the series. Only one other pitcher in baseball history, reliever George Frazier of the 1981 New York Yankees, has ever lost three games in one World Series. The third game Williams lost was Game 8 – baseball's decision to revert to a best of seven Series in 1922 significantly reduced the opportunity for a pitcher to obtain three decisions in a Series.

Also banned was Joe Gedeon, second baseman for the St. Louis Browns. A friend of Risberg, Gedeon learned about the fix from Risberg and placed bets on Cincinnati. He informed Comiskey of the fix after the Series in an effort to gain a reward. Yet, Landis banned him for life along with the eight White Sox, and Gedeon died in 1941.

The indefinite suspensions imposed by Landis in connection to the scandal were the most suspensions of any duration to be simultaneously imposed until 2013, when 13 players were suspended for between 50 and 211 games in connection with the doping Biogenesis scandal.

Joe Jackson

The extent of Joe Jackson's part in the big conspiracy remains controversial. Jackson maintained that he was innocent. He had a Series-leading .375 batting average—including the Series' only home run—threw out five baserunners, and handled 30 chances in the outfield with no errors. In general, players perform worse in games their team loses, and Jackson batted worse in the five games that the White Sox lost, with a batting average of .286 in those games. This was still an above-average batting average (the National and American Leagues hit a combined .263 in the 1919 season). Jackson hit .351 for the season, fourth-best in the major leagues (his .356 career batting average is the third-best in history, surpassed only by his contemporaries Ty Cobb and Rogers Hornsby). Three of his six RBIs came in the losses, including the aforementioned home run, and a double in Game 8 when the Reds had a large lead and the series was all but over. Still, in that game a long foul ball was caught at the fence with runners on second and third, depriving Jackson of a chance to drive in the runners.

One play in particular has been subjected to scrutiny. In the fifth inning of Game 4, with a Cincinnati player on second, Jackson fielded a single hit to left field and threw home, which was cut off by Cicotte. Gandil, another leader of the fix, later admitted to yelling at Cicotte to intercept the throw. The run scored and the Sox lost the game, 2–0. Cicotte, whose guilt is undisputed, made two errors in that fifth inning alone.

Years later, all of the implicated players said that Jackson was never present at any of the meetings they had with the gamblers. Williams, Jackson's roommate, later said that they only mentioned Jackson in hopes of giving them more credibility with the gamblers.

Aftermath
After being banned, Risberg and several other members of the Black Sox tried to organize a three-state barnstorming tour. However, they were forced to cancel those plans after Landis let it be known that anyone who played with or against them would also be banned from baseball for life. They then announced plans to play a regular exhibition game every Sunday in Chicago, but the Chicago City Council threatened to cancel the license of any ballpark that hosted them.

With seven of their best players permanently sidelined, the White Sox crashed into seventh place in 1921 and would not be a factor in a pennant race again until 1936, five years after Comiskey's death. They would not win another American League championship until 1959 (a then-record 40-year gap) nor another World Series until , prompting some to comment about a Curse of the Black Sox.

Name
Although many believe the Black Sox name to be related to the dark and corrupt nature of the conspiracy, the term "Black Sox" may already have existed before the fix. There is a story that the name "Black Sox" derived from Comiskey's refusal to pay for the players' uniforms to be laundered, instead insisting that the players themselves pay for the cleaning. As the story goes, the players refused and subsequent games saw the White Sox play in progressively filthier uniforms as dirt, sweat and grime collected on the white, woolen uniforms until they took on a much darker shade. Comiskey then had the uniforms washed and deducted the laundry bill from the players' salaries. On the other hand, Eliot Asinof in his book Eight Men Out makes no such connection, mentioning the filthy uniforms early on but referring to the term "Black Sox" only in connection with the scandal.

Popular culture

Literature
 Eliot Asinof's book Eight Men Out: The Black Sox and the 1919 World Series is the best-known description of the scandal.
 Brendan Boyd's novel Blue Ruin: A Novel of the 1919 World Series offers a first-person narrative of the event from the perspective of Sport Sullivan, a Boston gambler involved in fixing the series.
 In F. Scott Fitzgerald's novel The Great Gatsby, a minor character named Meyer Wolfsheim was said to have helped in the Black Sox scandal, though this is purely fictional. In explanatory notes accompanying the novel's 75th-anniversary edition, editor Matthew Bruccoli describes the character as being based on Arnold Rothstein.
 In Dan Gutman's novel Shoeless Joe & Me (2002), the protagonist, Joe, goes back in time to try to prevent Shoeless Joe from being banned for life.
 W. P. Kinsella's novel Shoeless Joe is the story of an Iowa farmer who builds a baseball field in his cornfield after hearing a mysterious voice. Later, Shoeless Joe Jackson and other members of the Black Sox come to play on his field. The novel was adapted into the 1989 hit film Field of Dreams. Joe Jackson plays a central role in inspiring protagonist Ray Kinsella to reconcile with his past.
 Bernard Malamud's 1952 novel The Natural and its 1984 filmed dramatization of the same name were inspired significantly by the events of the scandal.
 Harry Stein's novel Hoopla, alternately co-narrated by Buck Weaver and Luther Pond, a fictitious New York Daily News columnist, attempts to view the Black Sox Scandal from Weaver's perspective.
 Dan Elish's book The Black Sox Scandal of 1919 gives a general overview of the events.
 The Black Sox Scandal: The History And Legacy Of America's Most Notorious Sports Controversy by Charles River Editors talks about the events surrounding the scandal and gives a detailed description of the people involved.
 "Go! Go! Go! Forty Years Ago" Nelson Algren, Chicago Sun-Times, 1959
 "Ballet for Opening Day: The Swede Was a Hard Guy" Algren, Nelson. The Southern Review, Baton Rouge. Spring 1942: p. 873.
 "The Last Carousel" © Nelson Algren, 1973, Seven Stories Press, New York 1997  (both Algren stories are included in this collection)

Film
 In the film The Godfather Part II (1974), the fictional gangster Hyman Roth alludes to the scandal when he says, "I've loved baseball ever since Arnold Rothstein fixed the World Series in 1919".
 Director John Sayles' Eight Men Out, a 1988 film based on Asinof's book, is a dramatization of the scandal, focusing largely on Buck Weaver (played by John Cusack) as the one banned player who did not take any money. Also starring in the film were Charlie Sheen (Hap Felsch), Michael Rooker (Chick Gandil), David Strathairn (Eddie Cicotte), John Mahoney (Kid Gleason), Christopher Lloyd ("Sleepy" Bill Burns), Clifton James (Charles Comiskey) and D. B. Sweeney (Shoeless Joe Jackson). Sayles himself portrayed sports writer Ring Lardner.
 The 1989 film Field of Dreams, based upon the novel by W. P. Kinsella, discussed the scandal and featured two of the players involved, Joe Jackson (Ray Liotta) who played a large part in the film and Eddie Cicotte (Steve Eastin). Field of Dreams starred Kevin Costner, Amy Madigan and James Earl Jones.
 The 2013 film The Great Gatsby, based on the novel by F. Scott Fitzgerald, speaks of the man who fixed the 1919 World Series.

Television
 In the first season of Boardwalk Empire and the second season, the scandal is a large subplot involving Arnold Rothstein, Lucky Luciano and their associates.
 In fifth season of Mad Men, Roger Sterling tries Lysergic acid diethylamide (LSD) for the first time and hallucinates that he is at the infamous game.
 In the second season of Frankie Drake Mysteries, morality officer Mary Shaw mentions the scandal while helping Frankie investigate the murder of a player with circumstances related to gambling.
 The story of the scandal was retold by Katie Nolan in the sixth season of Drunk History.
 In episode 10, Rookie of the Year (Screen Directors Playhouse), Ward Bond plays a fictional character based on Shoeless Joe Jackson, one of the ball players banned for life from Major League Baseball because of his participation in the 1919 World Series scandal.

Music
 Murray Head's 1975 album Say It Ain't So takes its name after an apocryphal question put to Shoeless Joe Jackson during the court case.
 On Jonathan Coulton's album Smoking Monkey, his song "Kenesaw Mountain Landis" greatly fictionalizes the commissioner's quest to ban Jackson from baseball, in the style of a tall tale.

Theatre
 1919: A Baseball Opera,  is a musical by Composer/lyricist Rusty Magee and Rob Barron,  which premiered in June 1981 at Yale Repertory Theatre.
 The Fix is an opera by composer Joel Puckett with libretto by Eric Simonson, which premiered March 16, 2019 at the Ordway Center for the Performing Arts.

"Say it ain't so, Joe"
After the grand jury returned its indictments, Charley Owens of the Chicago Daily News wrote a regretful tribute to Jackson headlined, "Say it ain't so, Joe." The phrase became legendary when another reporter later erroneously attributed it to a child outside the courthouse:

When Jackson left the criminal court building in the custody of a sheriff after telling his story to the grand jury, he found several hundred youngsters, aged from 6 to 16, waiting for a glimpse of their idol. One child stepped up to the outfielder, and, grabbing his coat sleeve, said:
"It ain't true, is it, Joe?"
"Yes, kid, I'm afraid it is", Jackson replied. The boys opened a path for the ball player and stood in silence until he passed out of sight.
"Well, I'd never have thought it," sighed the lad.

In an interview in Sport nearly three decades later, Jackson confirmed that the legendary exchange never occurred.

See also

 Major League Baseball scandals
 Houston Astros sign stealing scandal

References

Sources
 Chicago Historical Society: Black Sox
 SABR Digital Library: Scandal on the South Side: The 1919 Chicago White Sox
 Asinof, Eliot. Eight Men Out. New York: Henry Holt, 1963. 
 Carney, Gene. Burying the Black Sox. Dulles, VA: Potomac Books, 2007. 
 Ginsburg, Daniel E. The Fix Is In: A History of Baseball Gambling and Game Fixing Scandals. Jefferson, NC: McFarland, 1995. 
 Gropman, Donald. Say It Ain't So, Joe!: The Story of Shoeless Joe Jackson. Boston: Little, Brown, 1979. 
 Pietrusza, David Judge and Jury: The Life and Times of Judge Kenesaw Mountain Landis South Bend, IN: Diamond Communications, 1998. 
 Pietrusza, David Rothstein: The Life, Times, and Murder of the Criminal Genius Who Fixed the 1919 World Series. New York: Carroll & Graf, 2003.

Further reading
 Fountain, Charles. The Betrayal: The 1919 World Series and the Birth of Modern Baseball. New York: Oxford University Press, 2015. 
 Hornbaker, Tim. Fall from Grace: The Truth and Tragedy of "Shoeless Joe" Jackson. Sports Publishing, 2016. 
 Hornbaker, Tim. Turning the Black Sox White: The Misunderstood Legacy of Charles A. Comiskey. Sports Publishing, 2014. 
 Zminda, Don. Double Plays and Double Crosses: The Black Sox and Baseball in 1920''. Lanham, MD: Rowman & Littlefield, 2021.

External links

 Chicagohs.org Chicago Historical Society on the Black Sox
 Eight Men Out – IMDb page on the 1988 movie, written and directed by John Sayles based on Asinof's book
 baseball-reference.com box scores and info on each game

World Series
Chicago White Sox postseason
Cincinnati Reds postseason
Criminal trials that ended in acquittal
History of baseball in the United States
20th-century American trials
Major League Baseball controversies
Sports betting scandals
World Series games
Match fixing
Arnold Rothstein